Cam out (also cam-out or camming out) is a process by which a screwdriver slips out of the head of a screw being driven once the torque required to turn the screw exceeds a certain amount. Repeatedly camming out damages the screw, and possibly also the screwdriver, and should normally be avoided.

Phillips screwdriver
The Phillips screwdriver design has a tendency to cam out during operation due to angled contact surfaces which create an axial force pushing the driver out of the recess as torque is applied. Despite popular belief, there is no clear evidence that this was a deliberate design feature. When the original patent application was filed in 1933, the inventors described the key objectives as providing a screw head recess that (a) may be produced by a simple punching operation and which (b) is adapted for firm engagement with a driving tool with "no tendency of the driver to cam out".

Nevertheless, the tendency of the Phillips screw to easily cam out was found to be an advantage when driven by power tools of that time which had relatively unreliable torque limiter clutches, as cam-out protected the screw, threads, and driving bit from damage due to excessive torque. A follow-up patent refining the Phillips screw design in 1942 describes this feature and further argues that if screw drive clutches were perfect, a screw recess with zero vertical contact angles (and thus no axial cam-out force) could be utilized, but claims that where these have been tried, unsatisfactory results on assembly lines have prevailed since the driving bits would not cam out in time to prevent damage.

Several later designs derived from Phillips, like Pozidriv and Supadriv were designed to reduce or eliminate the propensity to cam-out. In recent years, power tools can more accurately control fastener torque, and it is typical for precision engineered products to be assembled with Torx or Pozidriv head screws, which have been specifically designed not to cam out.

Robertson head screws
Robertson screws are commonplace in Canada, and significantly reduce cam-out when compared to Phillips screws.

See also 
 Torx

References

External links
 When a Phillips is not a Phillips! at Instructables.com

Screws